Acmaeodera pulchella, the flat-headed bald cypress sapwood borer, is a species of metallic wood-boring beetle in the family Buprestidae. It is found in North America.

References

Further reading

External links

 

pulchella
Articles created by Qbugbot
Beetles described in 1801